Patrick Ocan (born April 24, 1978) is a Ugandan economist and politician and a former member of the Parliament who represented the Apac Municipality for the Ugandan People's Congress (UPC).

Life and education 
Ocan attended Makerere University where he graduated with a bachelor's degree in Qualitative Economics.

Political career 
Ocan was elected to the Ugandan Parliament to represent Apac District in 2018 on the platform of UPC scoring 6,597 votes. Following his victory , Centenary Bank Uganda Ltd resumed a 12-year fraud case of fraud against Ocan leading to his arrest   He was accused of defrauding the bank of 25 million shillings after the money was discovered missing from the bank's treasury. Ocan denied the allegation, stating that the bank was defrauded when a customer brought in fake dollar bills for exchange which he accepted without discovering it.

Ocan was removed from his seat in parliament  along with five other legislators in December 2019 by the Constitutional Court of Uganda.  This was the a ruling of a case filed by a former Bufumbira East MP, Eddie Kwizera.  The case had challenged the legality of the six constituencies including Apac District created after 2016 elections. The court declared all six constituencies null and void.

References 

Living people
1978 births
21st-century Ugandan politicians
Makerere University alumni
Ugandan Roman Catholics
Place of birth missing (living people)
Members of the Parliament of Uganda
Uganda People's Congress politicians